Sankaranar Kudi Kadu is a village in the Orathanadu taluk of Thanjavur district, Tamil Nadu, India.

Demographics 

As per the 2001 census, Sankaranar Kudi Kadu had a total population of 1442 with 706 males and 736 females. The sex ratio was 1042. The literacy rate was 66.72.

References 

 

Villages in Thanjavur district